The Escuela Hemeterio Colón y Warens, also widely referred to as La Hemeterio or La Colón, is a public, intermediate school serving the city of Ponce, Puerto Rico. Its original, main building, built in 1913, is architecturally significant as a well-preserved example of the Puerto Rican school buildings of the early 20th century, a period of great transformation in Puerto Rico under the American administration. It was designed by insular architect Albert B. McCulloch using the California Mission Revival and Classical Revival styles, as well as some Modernist elements associated with the work of Antonin Nechodoma.

The school was entered on the U.S. National Register of Historic Places in 2022.

See also
National Register of Historic Places listings in southern Puerto Rico

References

External links
, National Register of Historic Places cover documentation

School buildings completed in 1913
1913 establishments in Puerto Rico
School buildings on the National Register of Historic Places in Puerto Rico
Mission Revival architecture
Neoclassical architecture in Puerto Rico
Education in Ponce, Puerto Rico